"In the Beginning" is a popular song,  by Dorcas Cochran, Kay Twomey, Ben Weisman, and Fred Wise. The lyrics commence: "In the Beginning the Lord made the earth...".

It was recorded by Frankie Laine in December, 1954 and released by Columbia as  catalog number 40378, the flip side  being "Old Shoes." Although the song did  not chart in the United States, it  reached #20 on the United Kingdom charts on March 5, 1955. The UK release was by Philips Records as catalog number PB 311 B (flip side of "Rain, Rain, Rain").

References

 

1954 songs
Songs with lyrics by Dorcas Cochran
Songs with lyrics by Fred Wise (songwriter)
Songs with lyrics by Kay Twomey
Songs with music by Ben Weisman
Frankie Laine songs